Michael P. Connolly (1860–1945) was an Irish Cumann na nGaedheal politician. A merchant and farmer, he was an unsuccessful candidate at the June 1927 general election, but was elected to Dáil Éireann as a Cumann na nGaedheal Teachta Dála (TD) for the Longford–Westmeath constituency at the September 1927 general election. He did not contest the 1932 general election.

References

1860 births
1945 deaths
Cumann na nGaedheal TDs
Members of the 6th Dáil
Irish farmers